Wolf-Dietrich Sonnleitner (born 23 October 1943) is an Austrian modern pentathlete. He competed at the 1968 Summer Olympics.

References

1943 births
Living people
Austrian male modern pentathletes
Olympic modern pentathletes of Austria
Modern pentathletes at the 1968 Summer Olympics
Sportspeople from Linz